Jordan Gray (born 1989) is an English comedian and author.

Jordan Gray or Jordan Graye may also refer to:

Sports
Jordan Gray (rugby union) (born 1993), American rugby union player
Jordan Graye (born 1987), American soccer player

Others
Jordan Gray, pseudonym of Mel Odom (author)
Jordan Gray, Girlfriends character played by Taran Killam